La vie en rose is the second studio album by Italian singer In-Grid. It was released in 2004, by ZYX Music. The album includes cover versions of French chanson schlagers. 

The album was a success in Poland, where it reached the second place in the chart and received a gold certification.

Editions 
There are several versions of editions: for example, for Eastern European countries on the album cover, the singer is depicted against the background of the Eiffel Tower to evoke associations with France; on the cover for Western European countries, the singer is depicted lying in rose petals, referring to the album title, the name Chilling With In-Grid was also added to the album title. In addition to the covers, the editions differed in the order of the tracks, some songs also had different arrangements and duration in different versions.

Track listing

Charts

Certifications

References

2004 albums
In-Grid albums
ZYX Music albums